The following is a list of notable films made in Meitei language (officially known as Manipuri language), by the Maniwood (Manipuri cinema industry), in alphabetical order.

0–9

A

B

C 

 Chatledo Eidi
 Cheikhei
 Cheina
 Chow Chow Momo na Haobara Shingju Bora na Oinambara
 Chumthang Makhong

D 
 Daughters of the Polo God
 Delhi Mellei

E 
 Eewai
 Ei Actor Natte
 Eibusu Yaohanbiyu
 Eidee Kadaida
 Eigi Kona
 Eikhoi Pabunggi
 Eikhoigi Yum
 Eikhoishibu Kanano
 Enakta Leiringei

F 
 Fried Fish, Chicken Soup and a Premiere Show

H 
 Hingbagee Mahao

I 
 Ichadi Manini
 Iche Tampha
 Ima Machet Icha Tangkhai
 Imoinu (film)
 Inamma
 Imagi Ningthem
 Ishanou

J 
 Japan Landa Imphal

K 
 Kaboklei
 Kadarmapee
 Kekoo Lotpee
 Khurai Angaobi
 Kum Kang Kum Kabi Chang

L 
 Lakhipurgi Lakhipyari
 Lallasi Pal
 Laman Ama
 Lamja Parshuram
 Lammei
 Langlen Thadoi
 Lanphamda Ibeni
 Larei Lathup
 Leikhamton
 Leipaklei
 Loktak Lairembee
 Luhongbagi Ahing

M 
 Magi Matambakta
 Mamado Leisabido Angaobido
 Mamal Naidraba Thamoi
 Manipuri Pony (film)
 Matamgi Manipur
 Mayophygee Macha
 Meitan Araba
 Moreh Maru
 Mr. Khadang
 My Japanese Niece

N 
 Nangna Kappa Pakchade
 Nangna Nokpa Yengningi
 Ngaihak Lambida
 Nakenthana Ngairi
 Nine Hills One Valley
 Nobap
 Nongallabasu Thaballei Manam
 Nongmatang
 Nongphadok Lakpa Atithi
 Nungshi Feijei
 Nungshit Mapi

O 
 Olangthagee Wangmadasoo
 Orchids of Manipur (film)

P 
 Paari (2000 film)
 Pabung Syam
 Pallepfam
 Pandam Amada
 Paokhum Ama
 Phijigee Mani

R 
 Rajarshi Bhagyachandra of Manipur

S 
 Saaphabee
 Saklon Amada
 Sambal Wangma
 Sanabi (film)
 Sanagi Tangbal
 Sanakeithel
 Sanarik

T 
 Tabunungda Akaiba Likli
 Taibang Keithel
 Tales of Courage (film)
 Tamoyaigee Ebecha
 Tayai
 Thawanmichakna Kenkhrabada
 Thoicha
 Tillaikhombee
 Tomthin Shija

U 
 Ureinung

V 
 VDF Thasana

Y 
 Yaiskulgee Pakhang Angaoba
 Yelhou Jagoi
 Yenning Amadi Likla

See also 
 Directorate of Language Planning and Implementation
 List of Kannada-language films

References 

Meitei language
 
Meitei language-related lists
Manipur-related lists
Lists of Indian films
Lists of films by language